Felipe Fraga (born 3 July 1995 in Jacundá) is a racing driver from Brazil. He currently competes in the Stock Car Pro Series, IMSA SportsCar Championship and Deutsche Tourenwagen Masters. He was the Stock Car champion in 2016 as well as Stock Car Light champion in 2013.

Career results

Career summary

 
(*) Season in progress

Complete 24 Hours of Le Mans results

Complete 24 Hours of Daytona results

Complete WeatherTech SportsCar Championship results
(key) (Races in bold indicate pole position; results in italics indicate fastest lap)

Complete 12 Hours of Sebring results

Complete Bathurst 12 Hour results

Complete Deutsche Tourenwagen Masters results
(key) (Races in bold indicate pole position; races in italics indicate fastest lap)

References

External links

Official website 
Profile at Driver Database

Brazilian racing drivers
1995 births
Living people
Stock Car Brasil drivers
Formula Renault 2.0 Alps drivers
Formula Renault Eurocup drivers
24 Hours of Le Mans drivers
Brazilian WeatherTech SportsCar Championship drivers
24H Series drivers
Top Race V6 drivers
Blancpain Endurance Series drivers
FIA World Endurance Championship drivers
24 Hours of Spa drivers
24 Hours of Daytona drivers
Sportspeople from Pará
Tech 1 Racing drivers
Strakka Racing drivers
AF Corse drivers
Mercedes-AMG Motorsport drivers
Brazilian Deutsche Tourenwagen Masters drivers
Michelin Pilot Challenge drivers
Asian Le Mans Series drivers